migme Limited (formerly mig33) was a global digital media company focused on emerging markets. The company was registered in Australia and was listed on the Australian Securities Exchange (ASX:MIG) from 11 August 2014 to 22 August 2017. There is also a secondary listing on the Deutsche Borse (WKN: A117AB). The company was formed in Perth, Australia in 2006 and commenced operations under the name mig33. In 2014, it was rebranded migme (and underwent a product and corporate overhaul). FIH Mobile, a handset unit of Taiwanese consumer electronics group Hon Hai Precision, took a 19.9% stake in the company in 2014. Originally developed as a social chatting and gaming application for feature phones, migme has grown to become a mobile entertainment platform that services Southeast Asia, South Asia, the Middle East and Africa. The company headquarters are in Singapore with offices in Malaysia, Indonesia, Taiwan, Hong Kong, Manila, and Australia. The company delivers social entertainment services through portfolio brands migme, LoveByte, alivenotdead and Sold.

In the time of 12 months, migme's market capitalisation fell from  $242.5 million to just  $27.2 million by the end of 2016. Migme shares have been suspended from trade since February 2017 and were of worth flows 4.4 cent each. The site and app service went offline since 7 August 2017. migme got suspended from Australian Securities Exchange on 22 August 2017 because of being unable to pay the annual listing fees.

History
mig33 was founded by Steven Goh and Mei Lin Ng in Perth, Australia in 2006. In 2007, it shifted operations to Silicon Valley where it focused on developing its engineering and technology capabilities and secured new venture capital. During this time, it acquired significant users in emerging markets of South Asia, Southeast Asia, the Middle East and Africa.

In 2012, it shifted its headquarters in Singapore to be closer to ghg Indonesia, Malaysia, Philippines, Nepal, India and Bangladesh.

The firm develops applications for Android, WAP, BlackBerry and web platforms. It has also released applications on legacy J2ME-based devices. The product was developed using open-source systems, and features group chat, social gaming and blogging functions as well as virtual gifting. Its revamped microblogging service, launched in 2013, enables users to post up to 300 characters.

Rebrand, investment and listing
On 10 June 2014 the company changed its name to migme Limited, and acquired alivenotdead.com, a Hong Kong-based artist community website co-founded by Patrick Lee, former chief executive of film review site rottentomatoes.com. Also in 2014, the firm completed a merger with Latin Gold Ltd., an Australian-listed mining company, which enabled migme to list on the Australian Stock Exchange by way of a reverse takeover, effective 11 August 2014. In 2014, FIH Mobile (a Foxconn-linked handset company) became the migme's largest shareholder through a $9.6 million investment, giving it a 19.9% stake in the company.

In October 2014, the company acquired LoveByte, a mobile app enabling couples to communicate, share thoughts and remember precious moments. LoveByte is headquartered in Singapore.

In January 2015, migme enters e-Commerce with acquisition of Sold.sg. Sold is an online pay-to-bid auction house and e-commerce business where customers can bid and buy quality products at competitive prices. Sold operates in Singapore and Malaysia.

Migme currently operates offices in Singapore, Kuala Lumpur, Jakarta, Manila, and Taipei.

On 20 April 2017 Solaris Power Cells, Inc. announced that it had signed definitive agreements to acquire Migme. However this deal didn't help migme to increase sales, instead they incurred a $23.1 Million after tax loss. The end of the deal with Solaris, on August 10, 2017, was announced via a press brief with Reuters.

Shutdown
The mobile app has been offline since early 2018. There, however, is no official statement on the specific reason about this unexpected situation yet.

References

External links 
 

Android (operating system) software
Mass media companies of Australia
Image-sharing websites
Online video game services
Defunct microblogging services